Bohdan Levkiv (22 February 1950 – 25 November 2021) was a Ukrainian politician. He served as mayor of Ternopil from 2002 to 2006.

Levkiv died on 25 November 2021, at the age of 71.

See also
 List of mayors of Ternopil

References

1950 births
2021 deaths
Mayors of places in Ukraine
Politicians from Ternopil